is a railway station in the city of Ueda, Nagano, Japan, operated by the private railway operating company Ueda Electric Railway.

Lines
Daigakumae Station is served by the Bessho Line and is 5.2 kilometers from the terminus of the line at Ueda Station.

Station layout
The station consists of one ground-level side platform serving a single bi-directional track. The station is unattended.

History
The station opened on 17 June 1921 as  It was renamed  on 1 June 1966 and renamed again to its present name on 1 May 1974.

Station numbering was introduced in August 2016 with Daigakumae being assigned station number BE08.

Passenger statistics
In fiscal 2015, the station was used by an average of 777 passengers daily (boarding passengers only).

Surrounding area
Nagano University
Ueda Women's Junior College
Nagano Prefectural Institute of Technology

See also
 List of railway stations in Japan

References

External links

 

Railway stations in Japan opened in 1921
Railway stations in Nagano Prefecture
Ueda Electric Railway
Ueda, Nagano